"Any Way The Wind Blows" is a popular song.

The music was written by Joseph Hooven and Marilyn Hooven, the lyrics by William D. "By" Dunham. The song was published in 1958.

The best-known version was recorded by Doris Day with the Frank DeVol Orchestra, on January 12, 1959, and released by Columbia Records as catalog number 41569.

References

1958 songs
Doris Day songs